St. Pantaleon, also Sankt Pantaleon (Central Bavarian: Pontigo)  is a municipality in the district Braunau am Inn in Upper Austria, Austria. A monument was erected by the riverlet Moosach in memory of the slave workers engaged there in 1940/41 at the Weyer concentration camp.

Geography
Sankt Pantaleon lies in the Innviertel. About 24 percent of the municipality is forest and 64 percent farmland.

References

Cities and towns in Braunau am Inn District